Lecithocera plicata is a moth in the family Lecithoceridae. It was described by Chun-Sheng Wu and Kyu-Tek Park in 1999. It is found in Sri Lanka.

The wingspan is 10–12 mm. The forewings are ochreous brown with a dark brown pattern. The cell-dot is obvious and the discal spot combines with the tornal stripe. The hindwings are greyish white in the basal half and brown in the apical half.

Etymology
The species name is derived from Latin plicatus (meaning coiled).

References

Moths described in 1999
plicata